Balagopal may refer to:

Krishna, a Hindu deity
K. Balagopal, a human rights activist
K.N. Balagopal, Indian politician
Revathi Thirunal Balagopal Varma, princess